Arne Åkermark (1902–1962) was a Swedish art director who worked on around a hundred and eighty films during a thirty-year career.

In 1948 Åkermark was employed in Britain for Ealing Studios epic Scott of the Antarctic.

Selected filmography 

 Colourful Pages (1931)
 Skipper's Love (1931)
 Dante's Mysteries (1931)
 The False Millionaire (1931)
 Ship Ahoy! (1931)
 Tired Theodore (1931)
 Black Roses (1932)
 Servant's Entrance (1932)
 International Match (1932)
 Mother-in-Law's Coming (1932)
 Love and Deficit (1932)
 His Life's Match (1932)
 Lucky Devils (1932)
 Dear Relatives (1933)
 Two Men and a Widow (1933)
 Augusta's Little Misstep (1933)
 Boman's Boy (1933)
 What Do Men Know? (1933)
 Marriageable Daughters (1933)
 The Song to Her (1934)
 Andersson's Kalle (1934)
 The Atlantic Adventure (1934)
 Fired (1934)
 Simon of Backabo (1934)
 Under False Flag (1935)
 The Marriage Game (1935)
 Walpurgis Night (1935)
 The People of Småland (1935)
 Adventure (1936)
 The Wedding Trip (1936)
 He, She and the Money (1936)
 Johan Ulfstjerna (1936)
 Conscientious Objector Adolf (1936)
 Unfriendly Relations (1936)
 It Pays to Advertise (1936)
 The Family Secret (1936)
 65, 66 and I (1936)
 Russian Flu (1937)
 John Ericsson, Victor of Hampton Roads (1937)
 Conflict (1937)
 Oh, Such a Night! (1937)
 Sara Learns Manners (1937)
 The Andersson Family (1937)
 The Great Love (1938)
 Dollar (1938)
 Just a Bugler (1938)
 Good Friends and Faithful Neighbours (1938)
 Art for Art's Sake (1938)
 Thunder and Lightning (1938)
 Emilie Högquist (1939)
 Oh, What a Boy! (1939)
 Variety Is the Spice of Life (1939)
 Whalers (1939)
 Nothing But the Truth (1939)
 Kiss Her! (1940)
 With Open Arms (1940)
 One, But a Lion! (1940)
 The Crazy Family (1940)
 Bright Prospects (1941)
 Dunungen (1941)
 Poor Ferdinand (1941)
 Goransson's Boy (1941)
 We're All Errand Boys (1941)
 The Train Leaves at Nine (1941)
 The Fight Continues (1941)
 Tonight or Never (1941)
 It Is My Music (1942)
 There's a Fire Burning (1943)
 Katrina (1943)
 Dolly Takes a Chance (1944)
 The Emperor of Portugallia (1944)
 His Excellency (1944)
 The Invisible Wall (1944)
 The Gallows Man (1945)
 His Majesty Must Wait (1945)
 The Journey Away (1945)
 Affairs of a Model (1946)
 Sunshine Follows Rain (1946)
 The Balloon (1946)
 Poor Little Sven (1947)
 Private Karlsson on Leave (1947)
 Scott of the Antarctic (1948)
 Each Heart Has Its Own Story (1948)
 Pimpernel Svensson (1950)
 Restaurant Intim (1950)
Living on 'Hope' (1951)
 Count Svensson (1951)
 The Girl from Backafall (1953)
 The Chieftain of Göinge (1953)
 Time of Desire (1954)
 Getting Married (1955)
 A Doll's House (1956)
 My Passionate Longing (1956)
 When the Mills are Running (1956)
 Woman in a Fur Coat (1958)
 A Difficult Parish (1958)
 Heart's Desire (1960)
 Lovely Is the Summer Night (1961)
 Ticket to Paradise (1962)

References

Bibliography 
 Barr, Charles. Ealing Studios. University of California Press, 1998.

External links 
 

1902 births
1962 deaths
Swedish art directors
Artists from Stockholm